Almond is a surname. Notable people with the surname include:

Barbara Almond (1938–2016), American psychiatrist and psychoanalyst
Bob Almond (born 1967), American comic book inker
Bobby Almond (born 1951), New Zealand footballer 
Brent Almond (born 1983), American film producer
Cliff Almond (musician), American drummer and percussion player
Cody Almond (born 1989), Canadian-born Swiss professional ice hockey centre
Darren Almond (born 1971), English artist
 David Almond (born 1951), British writer
 Edward Almond (1892–1979), American military officer
 Gabriel Almond (1911–2002), American political scientist
Hely Hutchinson Almond (1832–1903), Scottish physician and a politician
Henry Almond (1850–1910), English football forward
Harry Almond (1928–2004), British Olympic rower
 Hely Hutchinson Almond (1832–1903), Scottish physician and politician
Ian Almond (born 1969), English literary scholar and writer
J. Lindsay Almond (1898–1986), Governor of Virginia and Associate Judge of the U.S. Court of Customs and Patent Appeals
Jack Almond (1876–?), English footballer
James Almond (1874–1923), English footballer
Jeanie Almond, American trap shooter 
 Joan Almond (born 1935), American photographer
 John Almond (disambiguation) – multiple people
 Lincoln Almond (1936-2022), American politician
 Louis Almond (born 1992), English football forward
 Marc Almond (born 1957), English vocalist and recording artist
 Mark Almond, British writer
Mary Almond (born 1928), English physicist, radio astronomer, palaeomagnetist, mathematician, and computer scientist 
 Morris Almond (born 1985), American basketball player
Oliver Almond, English Roman Catholic priest and writer
 Paul Almond (1931–2015), Canadian television and motion picture director and novelist
Peter Almond, Australian judge
Roy Almond (1891–1960), Australian rugby league player
 Steve Almond (born 1966), American author
Willie Almond (1868–?), English footballer

See also 
 Philipp van Almonde, Dutch vice Admiral
Almand (surname)

References 

English-language surnames
Jewish surnames